Katende, or Sungu-Katende, was a royal sacred village of the Kingdom of Luba.
It was adjacent to the village of Kabondo.
Katende is on the upper Lomami in the Lualaba region in the Democratic Republic of the Congo.

Previously the Luba kings had built their palaces northeast of Lake Boya, but the move to Katende set a precedent for locating the capital near the Mashyo resource that was followed by Ilunga Sungu's successors.

According to legend, late in the reign of Mulopwe Ilunga Sungu (c. 1770 - c. 1810) the town had become so large that the "Lord of Hygiene" could not keep the streets clear of refuse and excrement, even working all day with the help of his sons and relatives. The old king complained, blaming the Bene Kanyoka, and said they should take their dirt home with them. The Kanyok went back to their home in the west and never paid tribute to the Luba again. The story refers to the break that occurred between the Luba and Kanyok people at this time.
Ilunga Sungu died at Katende and was buried there.

References

Sources

Populated places in Haut-Lomami